Romain Vadeleux (born ) is a retired French male volleyball player. He was part of the France men's national volleyball team at the 2010 FIVB Volleyball Men's World Championship in Italy. He played for Lausanne.

References

1983 births
Living people
French men's volleyball players